Barney's Version is a 2010 Canadian comedy-drama film directed by Richard J. Lewis, based on the novel of the same name by Mordecai Richler. The film was nominated for the Golden Lion at the 67th Venice International Film Festival.

Plot
Barney Panofsky is living with his best friend Boogie in Rome. He marries the mentally disturbed and unfaithful Clara Charnofsky after she tells him she is pregnant with his child. He later finds out the child  delivered stillborn  is not his, and he demands they separate. She commits suicide, and a devastated Barney decides to return home to Montreal.

Barney soon meets the woman who becomes his second wife, the daughter of a wealthy Jewish family. At their lavish wedding, Barney meets Miriam Grant and immediately falls in love. He tells her his feelings for her that night but she rejects him. 

Despite his marriage, Barney sends Miriam flowers and gifts. He later picks up Boogie, who comes to detox, for a few days at Barney's lake house. He later finds Boogie in bed with his wife. At first overjoyed that he has an excuse to divorce her and pursue Miriam, but later he questions Boogie's integrity. The drunk men argue, Barney shoots two bullets from his gun to dissuade Boogie from snorkling, one into the air before he trips and passes out onto the dock, and Boogie falls backwards into the lake. 

When Barney awakens, Boogie is missing. A detective tries to beat a confession out of him until his father, Izzy, intervenes. Barney continues to believe that Boogie ran away, and throughout the movie waits for him to reappear.

With his divorce final, Barney asks Miriam out on a date. He travels to New York City to meet her, and finally begin a relationship. They marry and have two children as Barney gets a job producing a television series. Izzy later dies in a brothel, causing Barney to laugh and cry and call his father a "King". Barney and Miriam live happily until, on another vacation to the lake house, Barney meets Blair, who works in radio, her old line of work. There is an immediate platonic connection between Blair and Miriam, much to Barney's noticeable consternation.

After Barney and Miriam's son, Michael, leaves home, Miriam informs Barney of her intention to return to work. He attempts to dissuade her but she persists and secures employment, thanks to support from Blair. Miriam begins work on a radio station but Barney misses her first on air interview  because he "was drunk and watching the hockey game, like has happened a thousand times before"  and is rude and dismissive to Miriam's colleagues. 

Miriam remains steadfastly faithful to him, but eventually his picaresque behaviour results in her taking a week-long visit to Michael's place in New York. While she is absent, Barney gets drunk at a bar and ends up sleeping with a former actress on his show. He tells Miriam about his infidelity and they divorce. She later marries Blair.

Barney, who displayed small signs of a deteriorating memory earlier in the film, forgetting where he had left his car on two occasions, now begins to show signs of an acute but unspecified memory loss. After Boogie's body is discovered near the lake house from an apparent sky diving accident, Miriam meets Barney for lunch in a favourite restaurant and offers to help as a friend. 

When Miriam returns from the bathroom, Barney has paid for the meal but forgotten his wallet. She follows him and, by the time she catches up to him, he has forgotten that they were divorced. He speaks to her as if it was years earlier, assuming that they're still married and that their children are quite young.

Barney's condition worsens until his death. While his children are helping settle some of his affairs at the lake house, they observe a "water bomber" plane scoop up water from the lake and dump it on a fire on the mountainside, showing the children what could have happened to Boogie, referencing an urban myth. The final scene shows Miriam visiting Barney's grave, leaving roses at a tombstone bearing both of their names.

Cast
 Paul Giamatti as Barney Panofsky
 Dustin Hoffman as Israel "Izzy" Panofsky, the father
 Rosamund Pike as Miriam Grant, the third wife
 Minnie Driver as the second wife
 Rachelle Lefevre as Clara Charnofsky, the first wife
 Anna Hopkins as Kate Panofsky, the daughter
 Jake Hoffman as Michael Panofsky, the son
 Bruce Greenwood as Blair
 Mark Addy as Detective O'Hearne
 Paula Jean Hixson as Grumpy's Bartender
 Scott Speedman as Bernard "Boogie" Moscovitch
 Thomas Trabacchi as Leo
 Clé Bennett as Cedric
 Saul Rubinek as Mr. Charnofsky, the first father in-law
 Harvey Atkin as the second father in-law
 Macha Grenon as Solange, the soap opera actress

There were also cameos by Canadian directors Atom Egoyan (early director of Barney's soap opera Constable O'Malley of the North), David Cronenberg (later director of Barney's soap), Paul Gross (star in Barney's soap), Denys Arcand (Jean, the maître d' at both of Barney and Miriam's luncheons beside the duck pond at Montreal's Ritz-Carlton), and Ted Kotcheff (train conductor).

Production

After being in development for 12 years, the film was released in September 2010 with Paul Giamatti in the title role. It was directed by Richard J. Lewis and produced by Robert Lantos from a screenplay by Michael Konyves. Filming took place in Montreal, Lake Memphremagog, Rome and New York. Special effects were produced by Modus FX in Montreal.

Release
The film grossed $472,892 in Canada over its first few weeks. As of April 17, 2011, the film had grossed $4.3 million in the United States and a total of $8 million worldwide. Most of the worldwide box office was in Italy.

Reception
, the film holds a 78% approval rating on the review aggregation website Rotten Tomatoes, based on 136 reviews with an average rating 6.65 out of 10. The website's critics consensus reads: "With a magnificent performance by Paul Giamatti, Barney's Version offers much comedy and insight to the complexities of modern romance." It also has a score of 67 out of 100 on Metacritic, based on 33 critics, indicating "generally favorable reviews".

Awards

References

External links
 

2010 films
2010 comedy-drama films
2010s English-language films
Canadian comedy-drama films
English-language Canadian films
English-language Italian films
Films about Jews and Judaism
Films based on Canadian novels
Films based on works by Mordecai Richler
Films featuring a Best Musical or Comedy Actor Golden Globe winning performance
Films set in Montreal
Films shot in Montreal
Films shot in New York City
Films shot in Rome
Sony Pictures Classics films
Universal Pictures films
Jewish Canadian films
Films directed by Richard J. Lewis
2010s Canadian films
Films about disability